The International Tour of Torku Mevlana is a cycling race held in Turkey. The event was first held in 1990, and was on the UCI Europe Tour in 2007 and again starting in 2015 as a category 2.2.

Winners

Juniors

References

Cycle races in Turkey
1990 establishments in Turkey
Recurring sporting events established in 1990
UCI Europe Tour races
International cycle races hosted by Turkey